Farida Khanum is a Pakistani classical singer from the city of Kolkata, West Bengal. She is also known by her honorific title Malika-e-Ghazal (The Queen of Ghazal) in both Pakistan and India and is widely regarded as one of the greatest exponents of the ghazal genre of singing.

Early life
Khanum was born in the fall of 1929 in Calcutta , British India. She had four siblings — a sister and three brothers. Her sister is the famous singer, Mukhtar Begum. Their entire family moved from Amritsar, Punjab  to Lahore, Pakistan when she was 18 years old.

She started learning Khayal, Thumri and Dadra from Ustad Ashiq Ali Khan of Patiala gharana. As a child, her sister Mukhtar Begum would take her to the Khan's place for regular riyaaz (practice of classical music). Her family moved to Pakistan after the Partition of India in 1947.

Career
Farida Khanum gave her first public concert in 1950 at the very young age of 21, and then joined Radio Pakistan where she gained recognition for herself. She became a star when Pakistan's president Ayub Khan invited her to a public recital in the 1960s. Farida also acted in films and she also sanged songs for films. She has been a frequent performer on Pakistan Television and other Pakistani TV channels.
The ghazal she is most associated with is Aaj Jaane Ki Zidd Naa Karo written by the famous poet Fayyaz Hashmi. In 2015, at the age of 86, she sang this ghazal in Coke Studio Season 8.

Farida Khanum's live concerts in India have been very popular. She also visited Kabul, Afghanistan in the late 1960s and early 1970s for concerts where she collaborated with Afghan musicians and sang Persian-language ghazals.

Personal life
Farida Khanum lives in Lahore, Pakistan. She has five daughters and one son. Farida Khanum has been affectionately called Queen of Ghazal in Pakistan. Her niece Sheeba Hassan is also an actress.

Filmography

Film

Discography
 1978 	Farida Khanum in Concert
 1979 	Farida Khanum in Concert Vol. 2
 1980 	Farida Khanum in Concert Vol. 3
 1985 	Taghazzul Farida Khanum Vol 1
 1993 	Farida Khanum: Meri Pasand Vol 2
 1993 	Farida Khanum: Meri Pasand Vol 1

Studio releases

Compilations and live albums

Awards and recognition

References

External links
 
 Farida Khanum's 2015 performance at Coke Studio (Pakistan)

1929 births
Living people
Recipients of Hilal-i-Imtiaz
Pakistani radio personalities
Recipients of the Pride of Performance
Pakistani ghazal singers
Singers from Kolkata
Singers from Lahore
Pakistani playback singers
Urdu-language singers
Pakistani classical singers
Patiala gharana
Women ghazal singers
Pakistani television personalities
Muhajir people
20th-century Pakistani women singers
Pakistani women singers
20th-century Pakistani actresses
Hum Award winners
20th-century Khyal singers
People from British India
21st-century Pakistani women singers
Punjabi-language singers
21st-century Pakistani actresses
PTV Award winners
Pakistani film actresses
Actresses in Punjabi cinema
Lux Style Award winners
Actresses in Urdu cinema
Radio personalities from Lahore